Charles or Charlie Butler may refer to:

Legal profession
Charles Butler (lawyer) (1750–1832), English lawyer and writer
Charles Butler (NYU) (1802–1897), American lawyer and philanthropist
Charles C. Butler (1865 – after 1937), Chief Justice of the Colorado Supreme Court
Charles Henry Butler (1859–1940), American lawyer and Reporter of Decisions for the U.S. Supreme Court
Charles Randolph Butler Jr. (born 1940), U.S. federal judge

Sportspeople

Charles Butler (cricketer) (1854–1937), Tasmanian cricketer
Charles Butler (figure skater) (born 1979), American ice dancer
Charles Butler (umpire) (born 1867), American professional baseball umpire
Charles Thomas Butler (born 1932), American bobsledder and Olympic medal winner
Charlie Butler (1897–1963), English footballer
Charlie Butler (Australian footballer) (1881–1945), Australian rules footballer
Charlie Butler (baseball) (1906–1964), Major League Baseball pitcher

Other

Charles Butler (author) (born 1963), English academic and author of children's books
Charles Butler (beekeeper) (1560–1647), English vicar, naturalist, philologist, musician
Charles Butler, 1st Earl of Arran (1671–1758), Irish nobleman
Daws Butler (born Charles Dawson Butler, 1916–1988), American voice actor
Charles E. Butler (1909–?), American poet
Charles Ernest Butler  (1864–1933), English painter 
Charles S. Butler (1870–1946), American physician and member of the New York State Assembly
Charles Salisbury Butler (1812–1870), British Member of Parliament for Tower Hamlets
Clifford Charles Butler (1922–1999), English physicist, co-discoverer of hyperons and K-mesons

See also
Charles Butler House (disambiguation)